Sir Nigel Elton Sheinwald  (born 26 June 1953) is a former senior British diplomat, who served as Ambassador to the United States of America between October 2007 and January 2012. He was appointed "Special Envoy on intelligence and law enforcement data sharing" in September 2014.

He is also a Senior Advisor to political consultancy Rasmussen Global.

Education
Sheinwald was born in London, England, and educated at Harrow County School for Boys and Balliol College, Oxford.

Career
Sheinwald worked in the Foreign and Commonwealth Office on the Japan desk from 1976-77 and on the Zimbabwe desk from 1979-81. He served in Moscow from 1978-79 and was Head of the Foreign Office Anglo-Soviet Section from 1981-83. From 1983-87, he worked in the political section of the British Embassy in Washington, D.C. From 1987-89 he was Deputy Head of the Foreign Office's Policy Planning Staff. He was Deputy Head of the Foreign Office's European Union (Internal) Department from 1989-92 and Head of the UK Representations Political and Institutional Section in Brussels from 1993-95.

Sheinwald was Foreign Office Press Secretary from 1995-98 and Europe Director from 1998 to 2000, before serving as the UK Ambassador and Permanent Representative to the European Union from 2000 to 2003. From 2003 to 2007, he was Foreign Policy and Defence Adviser under Prime Minister Tony Blair and then as Head of the Cabinet Office Defence and Overseas Secretariat.

He is credited with successfully negotiating the release of fifteen Royal Navy personnel from Iran in 2007. He made a critical breakthrough in the standoff during a call with the head of Iran's Supreme National Security Council, Ali Larijani. 

In October 2007 he was appointed Ambassador to the United States.

Sheinwald was appointed a Companion of the Order of St Michael and St George (CMG) in 1998, in 2000 was advanced to a knighthood as a Knight Commander (KCMG), and in 2011 was promoted to Knight Grand Cross of the same Order (GCMG). In June 2011, the Prime Minister's Office announced that Sir Peter Westmacott, then HM Ambassador to the French Republic, would replace him in January 2012 as British Ambassador to the US.

Views
Speaking to the New Statesman in November 2017, Sheinwald expressed unease about British Foreign Secretary Boris Johnson's influence on international affairs: “His [Johnson’s] style gets in the way of handling foreign relations in a serious, responsible way at a time of real difficulty for this country… I don’t think he’s been at all helpful to the UK national interest, and I think that’s very regrettable indeed.”

References

External links
Unflappable British Envoy Keeps Cool Amid Crises – The Washington Diplomat
UK Ambassador On The Presidential Race {video} – Boston Globe
Draw means UK and US ambassadors will split the bill – BBC News

1953 births
Living people
Alumni of Balliol College, Oxford
People educated at Harrow High School
Permanent Representatives of the United Kingdom to the European Union
Ambassadors of the United Kingdom to the United States
Knights Grand Cross of the Order of St Michael and St George
Directors of Shell plc